Gudjon Lincoln Johnson (January 29, 1899 – November 8, 1970) was a Canadian curler. He was the second of the 1934 Brier Champion team (skipped by his brother Leo), representing Manitoba.

References

Brier champions
1899 births
1970 deaths
Curlers from Winnipeg
Canadian people of Icelandic descent 
Canadian male curlers